State Road 75, the highest two-digit route in the U.S. state of Indiana consists of two discontinuous north–south segments.

Route description

Southern section

It begins at U.S. Route 40 at the Putnam-Hendricks county line and runs northward through the towns of Coatesville and North Salem in Hendricks County, and Jamestown and Advance in Boone County. There is a junction with U.S. Route 136 at Jamestown, and a junction with Interstate 74 just to the north. The northern terminus is at State Road 47 in the town of Thorntown.

Northern section
It begins at U.S. Route 421 / State Road 38 / State Road 39 in Frankfort in Clinton County and runs northward, crossing State Road 26 east of Rossville, and passing through the town of Flora where it crosses State Road 18. The northern terminus is at State Road 218 in the town of Camden in Carroll County.

History

When the Owensboro Bridge between Owensboro, Kentucky and Rockport, Indiana opened in September 1940, its northern end connected to a new nine-mile (14 km) stretch of state highway through Spencer County that directed traffic to State Road 66.  As the Kentucky highway which connected to the bridge was designated Kentucky State Route 75, Indiana gave its connector road the same number.

In 1954, U.S. Route 231 was extended through Kentucky and Indiana, and the southernmost stretch of 231 in Indiana was routed along State Road 75.  The Indiana Department of Highways removed State Road 75 from U.S. 231 in Spencer County by the early 1980s, along with all of U.S. 231's other concurrent designations throughout the state (others included State Road 45 and State Road 43).

In October 2002, with the opening of the William H. Natcher Bridge and the relocation of U.S. 231, this segment of highway was again redesignated, this time as the southern leg of State Road 161.

Major intersections

References

External links

 Indiana Highway Ends - SR 75

075
Transportation in Boone County, Indiana
Transportation in Hendricks County, Indiana
Transportation in Putnam County, Indiana
Transportation in Carroll County, Indiana
Transportation in Clinton County, Indiana
U.S. Route 231